Goniodoma nemesi is a moth of the family Coleophoridae. It is found in Croatia, Italy, Greece and Romania.

References

Coleophoridae
Moths of Europe
Moths described in 1970